Yampil is a city located in Vinnytsia Oblast (province of central Ukraine). The city is the administrative center of the Yampil Raion (district), housing the district's local administration buildings. Population:

Geography
The city is located on the Dnister River, directly on the Ukrainian border with Moldova, near the commune of Cosăuţi.

History

Yampil was first founded in the early 1600s. In 1924, the settlement received the status of an urban-type settlement.

Prior to World War II, the city had a large Jewish population. Particularly, in 1900, Yampil's Jewish population was 2,823. The city center consisted of a large number of Jewish-owned buildings and four synagogues. The city also had a castle and river port.

In 1985, it was named the administrative center of the surrounding Yampil Raion.

Demographics
In the 2001 Ukrainian Census, the city's population was 11,651.  the city's population consisted of 11,302.

Twin towns – sister cities

Yampil is twinned with:
 Soroca, Moldova

Notable people
Israel Orenstein

References

Cities in Vinnytsia Oblast
Cities of district significance in Ukraine
Populated places on the Dniester River in Ukraine
Bratslav Voivodeship
Yampolsky Uyezd
Shtetls